This is a list of Dutch television related events from 1967.

Events

Debuts

Television shows

1950s
NOS Journaal (1956–present)
Pipo de Clown (1958-1980)

1960s
Stiefbeen en Zoon (1964-1971)

Ending this year

Births
27 January - Rudolph van Veen, TV chef

Deaths